The Portage Diversion (also known as the Assiniboine River Floodway) is a water control structure on the Assiniboine River near Portage la Prairie, Manitoba, Canada. The project was made as part of a larger attempt to prevent flooding in the Red River Valley. The Portage Diversion consists of two separate gates which divert some of the flow of water in the Assiniboine River to a 29 km long diversion channel that empties into Lake Manitoba near Delta Beach. This helps prevent flooding on the Assiniboine down river from the diversion, including in Winnipeg, where the Assiniboine River meets the Red River.

This amount of water would have disastrous effects if left to flood southern Manitoba. During the flood of spring 2011, the Portage Diversion handled roughly half the flow of Niagara Falls.

The Assiniboine River and diking system can handle flows up to approx  without a serious breach. However, many properties between Portage la Praire and Winnipeg are flooded once the flows exceed 10,500 cfs, including commercial establishments such as the KOA campground in St Francois Xavier. Over the past few years as high river flows have occurred east of Portage la Prairie, residents have noted significant bank erosion and stands of trees decades old are dying off. In recent years government policy has allowed 12,000 + cfs down the lower assiniboine towards Winnipeg causing major property and environmental damage.

Under a state of emergency in  early May 2011, Manitoba authorities did extensive work by raising the dikes and were preparing to send up to  down the diversion  channel with bridges downstream being the determining factor in flow rate.,

The diversion was built at a cost of $20.5 million in 1970. The diversion control dam is 35 feet (11 m) high and 1,400 feet (430 m) long and allows  storage.

Flow Rates
Below are data from years of operation of the Portage Diversion when its use resulted in a 0.5 foot or more rise in Lake Manitoba:

See also
Red River Floodway
Shellmouth Reservoir

References

External links
Flood control works

Assiniboine River
Buildings and structures in Manitoba
Flood control projects
Flood control in Canada
Spillways